Fenimorea paria is a species of sea snail, a marine gastropod mollusk in the family Drilliidae.

This species is considered by WoRMS as a nomen dubium.

Description
The size of an adult shell varies between 10 mm and 27 mm. The shell is obsoletely channeled above the periphery which is not prominently angulated. The longitudinal ribs are numerous, rounded, not prominent, not interrupted on the periphery but continuous to the suture, The shell is sometimes obsoletely spirally striated. The back of the body whorl has a peculiar hump or longitudinal varix. The shell is yellowish white, banded and maculated with yellowish or orange-brown.

Distribution
This species occurs in the Atlantic Ocean off the Bahamas and from Florida to Brazil.

References

External links
 Fenimorea paria

paria
Gastropods described in 1846